KLYY (97.5 MHz, "José 97.5") is a commercial FM radio station located in Riverside, California, broadcasting to the Inland Empire, Greater Los Angeles areas. KLYY airs a Spanish adult hits music format. It operates from studios in Los Angeles with the transmitter located in the San Bernardino National Forest.

KLYY broadcasts in HD Radio.

History
KLYY signed on in 1959 under the call letters of KDUO, airing religious programming. It had been originally KQXM, owned by Leslie Morgan Wills, but was sold before it signed on. The KDUO call letters were used as it is the acronym for the phrase "Do Unto Others". KDUO was initially owned by the College of Medical Evangelists, a predecessor to Loma Linda University, until being sold to the Southeastern California Broadcasting Company and then the KFXM Broadcasting Company in 1961.

KDUO would later adopt an easy listening music format. However, the format was in decline in the 1980s and KDUO's ratings were in a steady decline.

On the morning of January 25, 1992 at 6 a.m. after playing "Up on the Roof" by the Nick Ingman Orchestra, KDUO dropped the easy listening music format and began stunting as a "public radio" outlet. Disc jockeys from other radio stations took over the station and each played a different music format every hour, including classic rock, pop, country, oldies, and smooth jazz. On January 31, 1992 at 5:00 p.m., the 97-hour stunt ended with an announcement that the new format would be oldies. The station adopted the name "K-Hits 97.5"; the first song played was "Good Vibrations" by The Beach Boys. Soon after, KDUO changed its call letters to KHTX. Despite the changes, the station's ratings did not improve much; this might be attributed to KHTX's marketing strategy. Instead of a direct challenge to KOLA, which was airing a similar format via satellite, it elected to target KRTH. This move was not successful, likely because it did not cover the entire Greater Los Angeles area and competition in the market was fierce as KCBS-FM aired an oldies music format at this time.

In 1994, KHTX dropped the oldies format in favor of country music. This put KHTX in direct competition with KFRG, which had a loyal listening audience evident by its high ratings. KHTX was acquired by Noggales Broadcasting.

KHTX's format was changed yet again in 1995, this time to Spanish hits under the call letters KVAR as "Variedades 97.5". In 1997, the station was flipped to Latin pop as “Super Estrella" adopting the call letters of KSSE.

On January 16, 2003, KSSE moved to 107.1 FM and a call letter swap landed the present KLYY call letters on 97.5 FM.

On January 8, 2018, Entravision flipped the KLYY/KDLD/KDLE trimulcast, carrying Spanish adult hits format "José 97.5", to Regional Mexican as "La Tricolor 97.5 y 103.1". Just four months later, on May 2, KLYY reverted to the previous Spanish hits format and "José 97.5" branding. On July 26, 2018, the station was flipped to "José 97.5".

On January 7, 2019, the KSSE/KSSD/KSSC simulcast on 107.1 began to simulcast "José 97.5", extending its coverage area to multiple cities and other areas.

History of the KLYY call letters
From 1996 to 1999, KLYY was known as alternative rock "Y107" at 107.1 MHz. Spanish Hits station, "Viva" (KLYY, KVYY, KSYY) operated on the 107.1 frequency from 1999 to 2003 but was divested by Big City after filing for Chapter 11 bankruptcy. As of July 2018, the 107.1 frequency carries KSSE, a Spanish Adult Hits station known as "José 97.5 y 107.1 ".

Previous logos

References

External links
Jose Radio Los Angeles Facebook
KLYY official website

List of ¨Grandfathered¨ FM ¨Superpower¨ radio stations in the United States

Radio stations established in 1959
Adult hits radio stations in the United States
Mass media in San Bernardino, California
Mass media in Riverside, California
1959 establishments in California
LYY
Entravision Communications stations